Milan Nikolić (Serbian Cyrillic: Милан Николић; born 30 March 1983) is a retired Serbian professional footballer who played as a midfielder.

Nikolić represented Serbia and Montenegro at under-21 level.

References

External links
 
 
 

Kategoria Superiore players
Association football midfielders
Changsha Ginde players
Chinese Super League players
Expatriate footballers in Albania
Expatriate footballers in Bosnia and Herzegovina
Expatriate footballers in China
Expatriate footballers in Kazakhstan
Expatriate footballers in Montenegro
Expatriate footballers in Uzbekistan
FC Irtysh Pavlodar players
First League of Serbia and Montenegro players
FK Jedinstvo Bijelo Polje players
FK Moravac Mrštane players
FK Napredak Kruševac players
FK Smederevo players
FK Trayal Kruševac players
Kazakhstan Premier League players
KF Vllaznia Shkodër players
Luftëtari Gjirokastër players
NK Zvijezda Gradačac players
Pakhtakor Tashkent FK players
Premier League of Bosnia and Herzegovina players
Serbia and Montenegro footballers
Serbia and Montenegro under-21 international footballers
Serbian expatriate footballers
Serbian expatriate sportspeople in Albania
Serbian expatriate sportspeople in Bosnia and Herzegovina
Serbian expatriate sportspeople in China
Serbian expatriate sportspeople in Kazakhstan
Serbian expatriate sportspeople in Montenegro
Serbian expatriate sportspeople in Uzbekistan
Serbian First League players
Serbian footballers
Serbian SuperLiga players
Sportspeople from Kruševac
Uzbekistan Super League players
1983 births
Living people